Yengema Secondary School or YSS is a government-sponsored secondary school that serves the town of  Yengema, in the Kono District, Sierra Leone.

External links
https://yosainternational.wixsite.com/yss-association/about-yss
http://www.deskgbongborkono.com/rich_text.html

Secondary schools in Sierra Leone
Eastern Province, Sierra Leone
Educational institutions established in 1964
1964 establishments in Sierra Leone